Max M. Teitelbaum (born January 27, 1932) is a former judge of the Federal Court of Canada. He was appointed in 1985 and retired in 2007. He was the first Jewish judge of the Federal Court of Canada. He is a graduate of the McGill University Faculty of Law, where he served as the Comment Editor for the McGill Law Journal.

References

1932 births
Living people
Anglophone Quebec people
Canadian Jews
Judges in Quebec
Judges of the Federal Court of Canada
McGill University Faculty of Law alumni
People from Montreal